Sebastopol was a New Zealand immigrant clipper ship of 992 tons, built in New Glasgow, Nova Scotia, Canada. She made two voyages to New Zealand in 1861 and 1863 sailing from Gravesend, England to Lyttelton, Christchurch with immigrants for the Canterbury Provincial Government.

The first journey departed on 5 September 1861 from Gravesend and arrived in Lyttelton on 14 December 1861 with about 223 passengers on board. The second journey departed 17 January 1863 from Gravesend and arrived in Lyttelton on 21 May 1863 with about 249 passengers. At the end of the second journey, a ship's surgeon committed suicide on board whilst the ship was in Lyttelton Harbour.

Other journeys included cargo bound for Australia, and Chinese passengers for British Guyana.

The ship came to an end after leaving the Port of Lyttelton in 1863 on the return trip to the United Kingdom.

References

 
 
 
 

1860s ships
Clippers
Immigration to New Zealand
Victorian-era passenger ships of the United Kingdom